The 2003 UAW-DaimlerChrysler 400 was the third stock car race of the 2003 NASCAR Winston Cup Series season and the sixth iteration of the event. The race was held on Sunday, March 2, 2003, in North Las Vegas, Nevada at Las Vegas Motor Speedway, a  permanent D-shaped oval racetrack. The race took the scheduled 267 laps to complete. At race's end, Matt Kenseth of Roush Racing would dominate the late stages of the race to win his seventh career NASCAR Winston Cup Series win and his first and only win of the season. To fill out the podium, Dale Earnhardt Jr. and Michael Waltrip of Dale Earnhardt, Inc. would finish second and third, respectively.

Background 

Las Vegas Motor Speedway, located in Clark County, Nevada outside the Las Vegas city limits and about 15 miles northeast of the Las Vegas Strip, is a 1,200-acre (490 ha) complex of multiple tracks for motorsports racing. The complex is owned by Speedway Motorsports, Inc., which is headquartered in Charlotte, North Carolina.

Entry list

Notes

Practice

First practice 
The first practice session was held on Friday, February 28, at 11:20 AM PST, and would last for 2 hours.

Second practice 
The second practice session was held on Saturday, March 1, at 9:30 AM PST, and would last for 45 minutes.

Third and final practice 
The third and final practice session, sometimes referred to as Happy Hour, was held on Friday, March 1, at 11:10 AM PST, and would last for 45 minutes.

Qualifying 
Qualifying was held on Friday, February 28, at 3:05 PST. Positions 1-36 would be decided on time, while positions 37-43 would be based on provisionals. Six spots are awarded by the use of provisionals based on owner's points. The seventh is awarded to a past champion who has not otherwise qualified for the race. If no past champ needs the provisional, the next team in the owner points will be awarded a provisional.

Greg Biffle would be the only driver to fail to qualify.

Full qualifying results

Race results

References 

2003 NASCAR Winston Cup Series
NASCAR races at Las Vegas Motor Speedway
March 2003 sports events in the United States
2003 in sports in Nevada